The Kincardine Davidson Centre is the local community and recreation centre in Kincardine, Ontario.

Located at 601 Durham St.  in Kincardine, Ontario the Davidson Centre is home to all things recreation in the Kincardine area. The building is owned and operated by the Recreation Department of the Municipality of Kincardine.

Service and Amenities

Outdoor Track
 Soccer Fields
Indoor Basketball Court
Indoor Running Track
Artificial Ice Rink with Bleachers for audience
Swimming Pool 
Meeting Rooms
Senior Rooms
Administration Office
Long Jump Pits
Pole Vault Track
Health Club 
Banquet Hall with fully equipped kitchen
A playground - Lions Park
Skate Park
Snack Bar

Additions

The original building was constructed back in 1975 and named after the Town of Kincardine's former recreation director, Keith Davidson. With nearby Bruce Power being the main source of income for the area, every time they get larger the population of the Municipality of Kincardine gets larger thus a larger facility is needed.

In late 2008 the Municipality of Kincardine approved the plans for a new addition. The addition was officially opened September 2009. The new addition added on a new health club, seniors room with add joining kitchen, computer room, billiard room and 4 new bathrooms.

With recreation booming in Kincardine, another addition was needed. Only 2 years after the first addition, a second addition was approved. The new addition costing $3 million includes a new gym for basketball, volleyball, indoor soccer, dodge ball and more. There are 2 curtains that can come down to divide the gym into 3 parts. Above the new gym there is an indoor running track as well as bleachers for the gym and a warm viewing area for the adjacent skating rink. The addition also includes bathrooms and new change rooms for the ice rink including the change rooms for the Kincardine Bulldogs.

Sports 
The Davidson Centre is home to the Kincardine Bulldogs, a Canadian Junior ice hockey team which play in the Western Ontario Junior C Hockey League.

The Kincardine Minor Hockey Association (KMHA) is the hockey association for the Kincardine area.  All teams in the association go under the name "Kincardine Kinucks".

During the summer months the Davidson Centre is also home to some other sports:  

The Davidson Centre is home to a recreation/competitive swim team, the Kincardine Kippers.  Kincardine Kippers is a youth program for ages 5–18.  Kincardine Kippers has a Winter session and a competitive Spring/Summer session. For further current information, check Kincardine Kippers' Facebook webpage. 

Kincardine Minor Soccer also uses the Davidson Centre as their home turf.

Kincardine Power Basketball Club was formed in 2017 and is using the Davidson Center as headquarters. It is OBA and Jr. NBA affiliated organization providing high quality programs for participants 4-19+ years old.

Events at the Davidson Centre

Relay for Life
Multicultural Night
Home & Garden Show
Track & Field Meets for local schools 
Weddings 
Christmas Parties
Stag & Does
KDSS’s Bash (Semi-Formal) and their Staff vs. Student Hockey Game

Buildings and structures in Bruce County
Community centres in Canada
Sports venues in Ontario